The Lady Pays Off is a 1951 American romantic comedy film starring Linda Darnell, Stephen McNally and Gigi Perreau, and directed by Douglas Sirk. A teacher finds herself with a large gambling debt that she has to pay off in an unusual way.

Plot
Evelyn Walsh Warren is named Teacher of the Year and her photo is on the cover of Time magazine, but she is dissatisfied with her uneventful life. That changes when she goes to Reno and inadvertently loses $7000 at the roulette table, mistaking $100 chips for $1 ones. Casino owner Matt Braddock offers her a deal: He will tear up her IOU if she finds out what is wrong with his nine-year-old daughter Diane, who is moping around, not eating and having nightmares. When Evelyn refuses, he suggests they cut cards for the debt. She gets a king, but he tops her with an ace (by cheating). Defeated, she accompanies him to his home in Carmel, California.

Frustrated at her predicament, Evelyn is initially cold to Diane, but after overhearing the child's telephone conversation with her father, Evelyn becomes ashamed of herself and quickly becomes fast friends with her young charge. Soon, Diane is happy, much to Matt's delight. In fact, she is so taken with her new private teacher that she begins maneuvering to set Evelyn up with her father.

Diane becomes frustrated when Kay Stoddard, Matt's old flame, shows up. Undaunted, the young girl manages to steer Kay into some poison oak to get her out of the way. Evelyn is hostile to Matt at first, but gradually warms to him. When they go out fishing on a boat, she secretly disables the motor to spend more time with him. Matt, however, flags down a commercial fishing boat owned by Manuel to take them aboard. Evelyn gets drunk on a seasickness remedy and  admits to Matt that she has fallen for him; they become engaged.

Matt sells his casino so his future wife will not be ashamed of him, but he gets a shock when Evelyn tells him that it was all an act. She goes home.

There, she receives a telephone call from Marie, Matt's housekeeper. Diane has run away. Frantic, Evelyn flies to Carmel, where she and Matt blame each other. However, it turns out that Diane (with Marie's encouragement) was just hiding. The little girl gets the two to realize they really do love each other.

Cast
 Linda Darnell as Evelyn Walsh Warren
 Stephen McNally as Matt Braddock
 Gigi Perreau as Diane Braddock
 Virginia Field as Kay Stoddard
 Ann Codee as Marie
 Lynne Hunter as Minnie
 Nestor Paiva as Manuel
 James Griffith as Ronald
 Billy Wayne as Croupier
 Katherine Warren as Dean Bessie Howell
 William Newell as Bartender (as Billy Newell)
 Paul McVey as Speaker
 Tristram Coffin as Carl
 Judd Holdren as Face
 Nolan Leary as Doctor
 John Doucette as Cab Driver
 Ric Roman as Ricky

Reception
TV Guide panned the film, stating "The unbelievable and obvious plot is further hampered by the miscasting of Darnell. Though he directed the film smoothly, Sirk has been quoted as saying he '[had] no feeling for this picture at all,' which is obvious in the final product."

References

External links

American black-and-white films
American romance films
Films directed by Douglas Sirk
Films set in California
Films set in Reno, Nevada
Films about gambling
Universal Pictures films
Films scored by Frank Skinner
1950s romance films
1950s English-language films
1950s American films